Marcella Polain (born 1958) is an Australian-resident poet, novelist and short fiction writer.

Early life and education
Marcella Polain was born in Singapore and migrated to Australia at the age of two with her Irish father and Armenian mother.

Polain studied Literature and Creative Arts at Western Australian Institute of Technology (now Curtin University). For a short while she attended the Australian Film, Television and Radio School in Sydney. At Western Australian Secondary Teachers' College (now Edith Cowan University), she took a Post Graduate Diploma in Secondary Education. Polain completed a PhD at the University of Western Australia.

Career
Polain entered the Perth poetry scene in the early 1990s. She was a founding member (along with Morgan Yasbincek, Julia Lawrinson, Tracy Ryan and Sarah French) of Perth's WEB women's readings, which brought guests such as Dorothy Porter and Gig Ryan to Perth. She has been poetry editor for the literary magazines Westerly and Blue Dog. She tutored in Writing for 10 years at Murdoch University before becoming Senior Lecturer at Edith Cowan University.

Her first novel, The Edge of the World, based on her family's survival of the Armenian genocide, won the University of Western Australia's Higher Degree by Research Prize for Publications, and was nominated for the 2008 Commonwealth Writers' Prize Regional best first book award.

Her poetry has been published internationally, and she has been a recipient of an Australia Council Grant for New Work of Fiction. In 2012, she co-founded the micropress 'fold editions', dedicated to the creation of hand-made books. She has worked interdisciplinarily with composer-musicians, visual artists and dancer-choreographers.

In April 2015, the Armenian translation of The Edge of the World was launched in Yerevan at the Centenary Commemoration of the Armenian Genocide, also part of the Global Conference Against Genocide. In 2015, Polain was also awarded the International Grand Prize for Poetry by the Academia Orient Occident.

Books

Poetry
 Dumbstruck (1996) Five Islands Press
 Each Clear Night (2000) Five Islands Press
 Therapy Like Fish: new and selected poems (2008) John Leonard Press

Novels
 The Edge of the World (2007) Fremantle Press
 La marginea lumii (The Edge of the World) (2012) Romanian translation by Sergiu Selian. Ararat
 Armenian translation of The Edge of the World, translated by Aram Arsenyan, edited by Aram Arkun. Apollon
 Driving into the Sun (2019) Fremantle Press

Short fiction
 "Skin" in Westerly (December 2005)
 "Sleep without Cameras" in Westerly (December 2010)
 "Beautiful Negatives" in The Kid on the Karaoke Stage and other stories ed Georgia Richter. (2011) Fremantle Press
 "A Calf is an Animal" in Westerly (December 2012)
 "Curtain Man" in Antithesis (2013)

Honours and awards
 Anne Elder Prize for "Dumbstruck" 1996
 Short-listing of "Each Clear Night" WA Premiers Poetry Award 2000
 Patricia Hackett Prize for "Skins" in Westerly 2005
 University of Western Australia's Creative Works Publication Prize 2007
 Shortlisting of "The Edge of the World" for the Commonwealth Writers Prize for First Book 2007
 Short-listing of "Therapy like Fish: new and selected poems" ACT Judith Wright Prize 2008
 Patricia Hackett Prize for "Sleep without Cameras" Westerly Dec 2010
 Long listing of "The Stubborn Murmur: The Armenian Genocide and After" in the Calibre Essay Prize 2010
 Australia Council Grant for Established Writers, New Work, Fiction, 2010–2011
 International Grand Prize for Poetry, Academia Orient-Occident, Romania, 2015

References

External links

Profile at Fremantle Press
Interview at PerthWoman.com.au

Australian poets
Living people
1958 births
Curtin University alumni
Edith Cowan University alumni
University of Western Australia alumni
Academic staff of Edith Cowan University
Australian people of Irish descent